Brummen is a railway station located in Brummen, Netherlands. The station was opened on 2 February 1865 and is located on the Arnhem–Leeuwarden railway. The station is currently operated by Nederlandse Spoorwegen. The station closed on 15 May 1938 and 27 September 1944. The station re-opened on 19 October 1940 and 18 May 1952.

Train services

Bus services

External links
NS website 
Dutch Public Transport journey planner 

Railway stations in Gelderland
Railway stations opened in 1865
Railway stations on the Staatslijn A
Railway stations on the IJssellijn
Brummen
1865 establishments in the Netherlands
Railway stations in the Netherlands opened in the 19th century